Arde Madrid is a Spanish period comedy-drama limited television series created by Paco León and Anna R. Costa, which premiered on November 8, 2018, on Movistar+. León also directed every episode of the series and stars in it, alongside Debi Mazar, Inma Cuesta and Anna Castillo. The series tells the story of the period which American actress Ava Gardner spent in Francoist Spain. On 14 November 2018, Movistar+ renewed the series for a second season, but on 3 May 2019, the creators announced their decision to not continue the series. The series premiered May 5, 2020 in the US and Canada on MHz Choice, a subsidiary of MHz Networks.

Premise
Ava Gardner's life in Madrid in the 1960s is told from the point of view of her maid and chauffeur, both spies in Franco's secret service, who report on her hedonistic lifestyle, filled with an elite group of artists, aristocrats and expats.

Cast 
Main
 Inma Cuesta as Ana Mari, an instructor of the Sección Femenina (lame due to polio) entering to work as housekeeper at Ava's Gardner residence to report on the actress' activities by feigning a marriage with Manolo.
 Paco León as Manolo, a scoundrel who starts working as Ava Gardner's chauffeur.
 Debi Mazar as Ava Gardner
 Anna Castillo as Pilar
 Julián Villagrán as Floren, Ana Mari's brother who has schizophrenia.
 Ken Appledorn as Bill Gallagher, Ava Gardner's secretary
 Osmar Nuñez as Juan Perón
 Fabiana García Lago as Isabel Perón
Other and cameos

Episodes

Accolades 

|-
| rowspan = "21" align = "center" | 2019
| rowspan = 7 | 6th Feroz Awards
| colspan = 2 | Best Comedy Series
| 
| rowspan = "7" | 
|-
| Best Lead Actor in TV
| Paco León
| 
|-
| Best Lead Actress in TV
| Inma Cuesta
| 
|-
| Best Supporting Actress in TV
| Anna Castillo
| 
|-
| Best Supporting Actress in TV
| Fabiana García
| 
|-
| Best Supporting Actress in TV
| Debi Mazar
| 
|-
| Best Supporting Actor in TV
| Julián Villagrán
| 
|-
| rowspan = "4" | 28th Actors and Actresses Union Awards || Best Television Actress in a Leading Role || Inma Cuesta ||  || rowspan = "4" | 
|-
| Best Television Actress in a Secondary Role || Anna Castillo || 
|-
| Best Television Actress in a Minor Role || Miren Ibarguren || 
|-
| Best Television Actor in a Minor Role || Julián Villagrán || 
|-
| 6th Platino Awards
| colspan = 2 | Best Iberoamerican Miniseries or TV Series
| 
| 
|-
| 66th Ondas Awards || colspan = "2" | Best Spanish Series ||  || 
|-
| rowspan = 2 | 21st Iris Awards || colspan = 2 | Best Fiction ||  || rowspan = "2" | 
|-
| Best Actress ||  Inma Cuesta || 
|-
| Rose d'Or || colspan = 2 | Best Comedy Drama and Sitcom ||  || 
|-
| rowspan = 5 | 7th 
| Best Comedy Series
|
| 
| rowspan = "5" | 
|-
| Best Comedy Actress
| Anna Castillo
| 
|-
| Best Comedy Actor
| Paco León
| 
|-
| Best Direction
| Paco León
| 
|-
| Best Screenplay 
| Paco León & Anna R. Costa
| 
|}

References

External links

Arde Madrid (Serie de TV) on Filmaffinity

2018 Spanish television series debuts
2018 Spanish television series endings
Spanish-language television shows
Period television series
Television series about the history of Spain
Movistar+ network series
Television shows set in Madrid
Television series set in the 1960s
2010s Spanish comedy television series
2010s Spanish drama television series
2010s comedy-drama television series
Spanish comedy-drama television series